Ahmadsargurab (also Romanized as Aḩmadsargūrāb and Aḩmad Sar Gūrāb; also known as Amasirurap) is a city and capital of Ahmadsargurab District, in Shaft County, Gilan Province, Iran.  At the 2006 census, its population was 2,223, in 603 families.

References

Populated places in Shaft County

Cities in Gilan Province